Akiko Gooden (born February 14, 1972) is an American former professional tennis player.

Born in Tokyo, Gooden was seven years of age when she moved to the United States and swam competitively as a child. Having settled on tennis, she became the nation's top ranked 12s and 14s player, before going on to play professionally.

Gooden, who reached a best singles ranking of 155, featured in the qualifying draws for the Australian Open, Wimbledon and US Open in 1990. As a doubles player she played in the main draws of the 1991 US Open and 1992 Australian Open.

ITF finals

Singles: 2 (1–1)

Doubles: 1 (1–0)

References

External links
 
 

1972 births
Living people
Japanese-American tennis players
Sportspeople from Tokyo
Japanese emigrants to the United States
American female tennis players
21st-century American women